Tomasz Oborski (1571–1645) was the auxiliary bishop of Kraków from 1614 to 1645.

1571 births
1645 deaths
Bishops of Kraków